The Béchamp reduction (or Béchamp process) is a chemical reaction that converts aromatic nitro compounds to their corresponding anilines using iron as the reductant.

This reaction was once a major route to aniline, but catalytic hydrogenation is the preferred method.

Reaction history and scope

The reaction was first used by Antoine Béchamp to reduce nitronaphthalene and nitrobenzene to naphthylamine and aniline, respectively. The Béchamp reduction is broadly applicable to aromatic nitro compounds.  Aliphatic nitro compounds are however more difficult to reduce, often remaining as the hydroxylamine. Tertiary aliphatic nitro compounds, however, are converted in good yield to the amine using the Béchamp reduction.

The reduction proceeds in a multistep manner. First, the nitro group is reduced to nitroso, which undergoes hydrogenation to a hydroxylamino group prior to further reduction to the amine.

Laux process
The traditional Béchamp reduction cogenerates gray-black iron oxides. The Laux process is based on the finding that the oxide coproduct is strongly affected by various additives, such as ferrous chloride, aluminium chloride, and even simply sulfuric acid, which are added before heating the iron-nitrobenzene mixture.  The innovations from Laux have shifted the emphasis of the Béchamp reduction for the manufacture of anilines to the production of valuable iron oxide pigments.  The method is still effective for reduction of nitroaromatics.

Further reading
Organic Reactions 2, 428 (1944)

References 

Name reactions
Organic redox reactions